The Horezu Monastery or Hurezi Monastery was founded in 1690 by Prince Constantin Brâncoveanu in the town of Horezu, Wallachia, Romania. It is considered to be a masterpiece of "Brâncovenesc style", known for its architectural purity and balance, the richness of its sculpted detail, its treatment of religious compositions, its votive portraits, and its painted decorative works.

The monastery has been inscribed by UNESCO on its list of World Heritage Sites.

See also
 List of World Heritage Sites in Romania

References

External links

 UNESCO World Heritage List - Horezu entry
 Hurezi Monastery at Romanian-monasteries.go.ro

1690 establishments in Europe
Monastery
Romanian Orthodox monasteries of Vâlcea County
Historic monuments in Vâlcea County
Brâncovenesc style architecture
Religious organizations established in the 1690s
Christian monasteries established in the 17th century
World Heritage Sites in Romania